General Sir Henry de Beauvoir De Lisle,  (27 July 1864 – 16 July 1955), known as Beauvoir De Lisle, was a British Army officer and sportsman. He served in both the Second Boer War and the First World War.

Military career
Born in Guernsey and educated in Jersey, De Lisle was commissioned into the 2nd Battalion Durham Light Infantry in 1883. He saw service with the Mounted Infantry in Egypt between 1885 and 1886, being awarded his Distinguished Service Order there, and was promoted to the rank of captain on 1 October 1891.

De Lisle studied at the Staff College, Camberley in 1899. During the Second Boer War he commanded the Australian Brigade, a mobile column comprising the 6th Battalion Mounted Infantry, the West Australian Mounted Infantry, the South Australian Imperial Bushmen and the New South Wales Mounted Rifles. He was severely wounded and three times mentioned in despatches. Promotion to major followed on 1 January 1902, and to the brevet rank of lieutenant colonel on the following day. During the early months of 1902 his brigade was stationed in Natal, but in April he left the command of this brigade and transferred to Transvaal where there was more intense fighting. He left Cape Town for the United Kingdom in late May 1902. In a despatch dated 23 June 1902, Lord Kitchener, Commander-in-Chief during the latter part of the war, described De Lisle as "an officer of remarkable force of character. He has soldierly qualities and is a fine leader." For his service he was appointed a Companion of the Order of the Bath on 21 August 1902, and received the actual decoration from King Edward VII at Buckingham Palace on 24 October 1902. After his return he formally transferred to the cavalry when he was commissioned major in the 5th (Princess Charlotte of Wales's) Dragoon Guards on 22 October 1902. The following month he was appointed in command of the 2nd Provisional Regiment of Hussars at Hounslow.

De Lisle was appointed second-in-command of the 1st (Royal) Dragoons in 1903 and then became Commanding Officer of the regiment in 1906. He became a General Staff Officer at Aldershot in 1910 and in 1911 was appointed commander of the 2nd Cavalry Brigade. He served in the First World War, initially as commander of the 2nd Cavalry Brigade on the Western Front and then as General Officer Commanding (GOC) 1st Cavalry Division, also on the Western Front, in 1914.

De Lisle then became GOC 29th Division, leading the division at the Third Battle of Krithia during the Gallipoli campaign of April 1915 to January 1916. He returned to the Western Front in 1916 and fought at the Battle of the Somme before moving on to become GOC XIII Corps in March 1918 and GOC XV Corps in April 1918. After the war he was appointed GOC-in-Chief of Western Command: he held this post until 1923 and then retired in 1926.

Retirement
De Lisle was known for his polo skills and spent much of the years 1929 to 1930 training polo teams for the Maharaja of Kashmir in India.

Family
De Lisle married on 16 July 1902, at Stoke Poges church, Leila Annette Bryant, daughter of Wilberforce Bryant, of Stoke Park, Buckinghamshire (the proprietor of Bryant and May, matchmakers).

Bibliography
 Reminiscences of sport and war by Beauvoir De Lisle, Eyre & Spottiswoode, 1939
 Tournament Polo by Beauvoir De Lisle, Charles Scribner's Sons, 1938
 Polo in India by Beauvoir De Lisle, Thacker, 1907

References

|-
 

|-

1864 births
1955 deaths
British Army generals
1st The Royal Dragoons officers
British Army cavalry generals of World War I
British Army personnel of the Mahdist War
British Army personnel of the Second Boer War
Companions of the Distinguished Service Order
Durham Light Infantry officers
Graduates of the Staff College, Camberley
Knights Commander of the Order of St Michael and St George
Knights Commander of the Order of the Bath
Guernsey people